Coenagrion resolutum, the taiga bluet,  is a damselfly which is part of the family of Coenagrionidae found in North America.

Appearance 
The male is blue with black markings on the top of the abdomen and greenish sides on the thorax. The black markings are half length on segments 3 to 5. The females are greenish blue or yellowish green with black dorsal markings that are nearly contiguous on the abdomen. The wings are held behind the body. The wingspan is between 27 and 33 mm.

References 

Coenagrionidae
Insects described in 1876